The New Kadampa Tradition – International Kadampa Buddhist Union (NKT—IKBU) is a global Buddhist new religious movement founded by Kelsang Gyatso in England in 1991. In 2003 the words "International Kadampa Buddhist Union" (IKBU) were added to the original name "New Kadampa Tradition". The NKT-IKBU is an international organisation registered in England as a charitable, or non-profit, company. It currently lists more than 200 centres and around 900 branch classes/study groups in 40 countries. The BBC describe the New Kadampa Tradition as "one of the major Buddhist schools in the UK, founded by the Tibetan-born Geshe Kelsang Gyatso."

The NKT-IKBU describes itself as "an entirely independent Buddhist tradition" inspired and guided by "the ancient Kadampa Buddhist Masters and their teachings, as presented by Kelsang Gyatso". Its founder, Kelsang Gyatso, sought to make Buddhist meditation and teaching more readily accessible to twenty-first century living. He also wanted to ensure that people did not simply study Tibetan Buddhism from an academic point of view, but learned how to extend this knowledge through meditation and practical Buddhist experience. The NKT-IKBU is described as being "very successful at disseminating its teachings" and Geshe Kelsang's books have been called "very popular".

The NKT-IKBU has expanded more rapidly than any other Buddhist tradition in Great Britain, and has spread across the globe with 1.200 affiliated centers over more than 40 countries. In 2003, Daniel Cozort (2003: 231) described the NKT as one of the largest and fastest growing Tibetan Buddhist organizations in the world, and as “a Western order that draws primarily upon the teachings of the Gelukpa tradition but is not subordinate to Tibetan authorities. Some Tibetans have described it as a "controversial organization" and a "controversial" new religious movement, or a breakaway Buddhist sect. Modern Buddhism, one of Kelsang Gyatso's most popular books, says: "Today we can see many different forms of Buddhism, such as Zen and Theravada Buddhism. All these are equally precious, they are just different presentations."

According to Harding, Hori, and Soucy, “Global Buddhism... attempts to transcend the parochialism of local place and ethnic identity” (2014: 16). The attempt to transcend the parochialism of Tibet and Tibetan politico-ethnic identity is high-priority for the NKT. Considered in the context
of the movement’s global missionary efforts, the NKT is clearly a form of global Buddhism."

Historical background of the formation of NKT
In 1976 the students of Thubten Yeshe founded the Manjushri Institute with Lama Yeshe as the Spiritual Director and purchased the assets of Conishead Priory, a neglected Victorian mansion in Ulverston, England for £70,000. The same year Thubten Yeshe and Thubten Zopa Rinpoche visited Kelsang Gyatso in India and invited him over to teach at the Manjushri Institute, which was a part of their FPMT network.

According to David N. Kay, Kelsang Gyatso was invited in 1976 by Thubten Yeshe and Thubten Zopa, who sought the advice of the 14th Dalai Lama when choosing Kelsang Gyatso. Whereas according to a NKT brochure, "Lama Yeshe requested Trijang Rinpoche to ask Kelsang Gyatso to become Resident Teacher of Manjushri Institute. Kelsang Gyatso later recounted that Kyabje Trijang Rinpoche asked him to go to England, teach Shantideva's Guide to the Bodhisattva's Way of Life, Chandrakirti's Guide to the Middle Way and Lamrim, and then check whether there was any meaning in his continuing to stay."

Kelsang Gyatso was requested by Lama Yeshe to lead the "General Program" of Buddhist study. In 1979 Lama Yeshe asked a Geshe at Manjushri Institute, Geshe Jampa Tekchok, to teach a parallel twelve-year Geshe Studies Programme, recognised and validated by the Dalai Lama and modelled on the program of studies for the traditional geshe degree. From 1982 to 1990 this program was led by Geshe Konchog Tsewang. According to a disciple of Lama Yeshe from this time, Lama Yeshe intended the institute "to become the central monastery of the FPMT... one of the early jewels of the FPMT crown" and "the pioneer among the western centres".

In the late 1970s, Kelsang Gyatso, without consulting Thubten Yeshe, opened up a Buddhist Centre in York under his own spiritual direction. Kay sees this as the beginning of a conflict between Thubten Yeshe and Kelsang Gyatso. However, according to Kelsang Gyatso, "the opening of the Centre in York caused not one moment of confusion or disharmony". Kelsang Gyatso was asked to resign so that another Geshe, described by Kay as "more devoted to FPMT objectives", could take over as a resident teacher of Manjushri Institute. Many students of Kelsang Gyatso petitioned him to stay and teach them, and on this basis he decided to remain. In the following years prior 1990 Kelsang Gyatso established 15 centres under his own direction in Great Britain and Spain.

Both Kay and Cozort describe the management committee of Manjushri Institute from 1981 onwards as made up principally of Kelsang Gyatso's closest students, also known as "the Priory group". According to Kay, "The Priory Group became dissatisfied with the FPMT's increasingly centralized organisation." Cozort stated that different disagreements "led to a rift between Lama Yeshe and his students and Geshe Kelsang Gyatso and his, and eventually the Manjushri Board of directors ( Geshe Gyatso's students) severed the connection of the between institute and FPMT." According to Kay, Lama Yeshe tried at different times to reassert his authority over the institute, but his attempts were unsuccessful. Kay goes on to describe an open conflict of authority which developed between the Priory Group and the FPMT administration in 1983. In February 1984 the conflict was mediated by the Office of the Dalai Lama in London. Kay states that after the death of Thubten Yeshe in March 1984, the FPMT lost interest because they saw it as a fruitless case. Since that time, Kay stated, the Manjushri Institute has developed mainly under the guidance of Kelsang Gyatso without further reference to the FPMT, but legally remained part of the FPMT until late 1990.

According to Kay, of the two Geshes at Manjushri Institute, it was Kelsang Gyatso who had always taken the greater interest in the running and direction of the institute, and most of the students there were closer to him. The courses offered by both Geshes complemented each other, but as Kay remarked, they "differed in one important respect: only Geshe Kelsang's General Programme included courses on Tantric Buddhism, and attendance upon these required the reception of a Tantric empowerment."

Kelsang Gyatso made a three-year retreat from 1987 to 1990 in Dumfries, Scotland and asked Geshe Losang Pende from Ganden Shartse monastery to lead the General Program in his absence, whilst Geshe Konchog Tsewang continued to teach the Geshe Studies Programme at Conishead Priory (Manjushri Institute). Different Lamas, including Thubten Zopa, were still invited. Especially the visit of Thubten Zopa in 1988 "is significant, indicating the ongoing devotion of the students to this lama and their desire to leave the negativity of the schism with the FPMT in the past." In 1988 and 1990 the uncle of Kelsang Gyatso, Choyang Duldzin Kuten Lama, the oracle of Dorje Shugden, also visited Manjushri Institute. Before that time Song Rinpoche, Geshe Lhundup Sopa, Geshe Rabten, as well as other Buddhist teachers such as Ajahn Sumedho and Thích Nhất Hạnh have taught at Manjushri Institute.

During Kelsang Gyatso's period of retreat he wrote some of his books and worked out the foundations of the NKT. Kay states: "The first major development that took place during Geshe Kelsang's retreat was the introduction of the 'Teacher Training Programme' (TTP) at the Manjushri Institute."

According to Kay, Kelsang Gyatso was gravely concerned that the purity of Tsongkhapa's tradition was being undermined by the lingering inclusivism of his Western students, something he had been outspoken for some years. Kay states that another result of these "radically exclusive policies" was that after the foundation of the NKT the Manjushri Institute Library, with over 3,000 books, was removed. From this point onwards, Tibetan Gelug lamas would no longer be invited to teach within his network. The pictures of the Dalai Lama were removed from the gompas and shrines of Kelsang Gyatso's centres.

The foundation of the New Kadampa Tradition
In the Spring of that same year, Kelsang Gyatso announced the creation of the 'New Kadampa Tradition', an event which was celebrated in the NKT-Magazine Full Moon as "a wonderful development in the history of the Buddhadharma." In 1992, the Manjushri Institute developed a new constitution, which constituted the formal foundation of the NKT. The Manjushri Institute was renamed the Manjushri Mahayana Buddhist Centre, and later the Manjushri Kadampa Meditation Centre. Since then, it has remained the NKT's flagship centre.

With the foundation of the New Kadampa Tradition (NKT) by Kelsang Gyatso, he established a new and independent religious movement aiming to "principally follow the teachings and example of Je Tsongkhapa". This also gave a new identity to his followers. The many NKT centres which were built up rapidly by his followers could gather under the common auspices of the NKT and their spiritual guide, distinguishing and disassociating themselves from other Tibetan Buddhist traditions, especially the Gelug school from which Kelsang Gyatso originated. Cozort describes this as unusual in the Tibetan tradition. The NKT described themselves as being "an entirely independent Buddhist tradition with no political affiliations... that is appropriate to the needs and conditions of the modern world".

David Kay comments:

The Internal Rules 
The defining and governing document for the NKT is called A Moral Discipline Guide—The Internal Rules of the New Kadampa Tradition ~ International Kadampa Buddhist Union.

The identity of the NKT
In 1998 Kelsang Gyatso stated in an interview:

According to an NKT brochure, written by James Belither while secretary of the NKT:

Nowadays the New Kadampa Tradition describes Kelsang Gyatso's presentation of Buddhism to the West as Kadampa Buddhism with the following statement:

Moreover, the NKT presents itself as being the continuation of the ancient Kadampa tradition by naming its school Kadampa Buddhism and equating this Kadampa Buddhism with the historical Kadampa School of Atisha:

Followers of the NKT refer to themselves as Kadampa Buddhists, the temples of the New Kadampa Tradition are referred to as Kadampa Buddhist Temples, and more recently, NKT teachers are named Kadampa teachers. Additionally, the Dharma centres of the New Kadampa Tradition are called Kadampa Buddhist Centres.

James Belither, the former secretary of the NKT, described the NKT as "a Mahayana Buddhist tradition with historical connections with Tibet", rather than a Tibetan tradition, and explained that Kelsang Gyatso wished his followers always "to present Dharma in a way appropriate to their own culture and society without the need to adopt Tibetan culture and customs".

Whereas the NKT celebrate Kelsang Gyatso as the one who "is primarily responsible for the worldwide revival of Kadampa Buddhism in our time", "critics have described The New Kadampa Tradition as a breakaway sect or cult and argue it is not part of the ancient Kadampa Tradition but a split from the Gelug school of Tibetan Buddhism." Tibetologist Thierry Dodin has described the NKT as a cult, "... on the basis of its organisational form, its excessive group pressure and blind obedience to its founder. The organisation's extreme fanaticism and aggressive missionary drive are typical cult features too." On their website, the New Kadampa Tradition have countered the claims by Tibetan Buddhists that they are a cult.

Bluck remarked that there remains an apparent contradiction between claiming a pure Tibetan lineage and separating completely from contemporary Tibetan tradition. While the NKT strongly emphasises its unbroken 'lineage', it has no Tibetan followers and claims to stand outside current Tibetan Buddhism.

A legally binding document entitled The Internal Rules, §1, was approved by the UK Charity Commission in 2020 and indicates the tradition is democratic. The NKT is defined as follows: "the union of Kadampa Buddhist Centers, the international association of study and meditation centers that follow the tradition of Mahayana Buddhism derived from the Buddhist meditators and scholars Atisha (982-1054 AD) and Je Tsongkhapa (1357-1419 AD), introduced into the West by the Buddhist teacher Venerable Geshe Kelsang Gyatso, the Founder of the New Kadampa Tradition ~ International Kadampa Buddhist Union."

Activities

Teachings and books
Bluck lists the specific traditional teachings that are seen as important in the NKT-IKBU: "the nature of the mind, karma and reincarnation, the preciousness of human life, the role of meditation, death, and the commitments of going for refuge", as well as "understanding the Four Noble Truths, developing renunciation, and the training of moral discipline, concentration and wisdom", followed by "becoming a compassionate bodhisattva (by developing bodhicitta and the six perfections), understanding the ultimate truth of emptiness and finally attaining Buddhahood."

The NKT-IKBU's teachings are based exclusively on the teachings and published works of Kelsang Gyatso, which in turn are commentaries on Gelug works, especially those of its founder Je Tsongkhapa's texts. According to Helen Waterhouse, Kelsang Gyatso followed the Tibetan Buddhist custom of studying texts through the teacher's commentaries. With respect to the contents of the teachings she states that "NKT doctrine is not different from that of mainline Gelugpa", with a Prasangika Madhyamaka philosophical orientation, and emphasising the teachings on dependent arising and emptiness. The main practice in the NKT-IKBU is Lamrim (the Stages of the Path to Enlightenment), Lojong (Training the Mind), and Vajrayana Mahamudra (the practices of Highest Yoga Tantra). The books studied in the NKT are published by the Buddhist publishing house Tharpa Publications.

Study programs
NKT-IKBU offers three study programs: "the open and introductory General Programme, the Foundation Programme for more committed practitioners, and the demanding Teacher Training Programme." The study programs of the NKT-IKBU are what distinguishes it from all other Buddhist traditions. Giving an overview of the purpose of the programs, the NKT-IKBU says: "Venerable Geshe Kelsang Gyatso has designed three special Study Programs for the systematic study and practice of Kadampa Buddhism that are especially suited to the modern world." It is believed by NKT-IKBU followers that the teachings transmit the pure lineage of Je Tsongkhapa in its entirety.

The three spiritual programs are:
 The General Program (GP), which provides an introduction to basic Buddhist ideas and meditation. Cozort explains that GP classes are "simply the ongoing general instructure for all comers at NKT Centers or wherever NKT teachers find a venue for teaching."
 The Foundation Program (FP), which includes the study of six commentaries written by Kelsang Gyatso on the following classical texts. Cozort remarks that the format of study resembles that of a British or American University, "with textbooks, lectures, small and large group discussion, and examinations."
 Joyful Path of Good Fortune – based on Atisha's teachings on Lamrim or The Stages of the Path to Enlightenment
 Universal Compassion – a commentary on Bodhisattva Geshe Chekhawa's Training the Mind in Seven Points
 Eight Steps to Happiness – a commentary on Bodhisattva Langri Tangpa's Eight Verses of Training the Mind
 The New Heart of Wisdom – a commentary on the Heart Sutra
 Meaningful to Behold – a commentary on Shantideva's Guide to the Bodhisattva's Way of Life
 Understanding the Mind – a commentary and detailed explanation of the mind based on the works of the Buddhist scholars Dharmakirti and Dignaga
 The Teacher Training Program (TTP) is, according to Cozort, the "NKT's most ambitious undertaking," intended for people who wish to train as NKT-IKBU Dharma Teachers who, in turn, will teach Buddhism to newcomers as well as serve as tantric gurus. All Resident Teachers of NKT-IKBU Centers follow this program of study and practice. The program involves the study of 14 texts of Kelsang Gyatso, including all of those in the Foundation Program, and the additional 8 listed below. This program also includes commitments concerning one's lifestyle, based on the 5 lay vows of the Pratimoksha, and the completion of specific meditation retreats "on each of the preliminary practices (sngon 'gro)." There is also a "teaching skills" class every month.
 The Bodhisattva Vow – a commentary on Mahayana moral discipline and the practice of the six perfections
 Ocean of Nectar – a commentary on Chandrakirti's Guide to the Middle Way
 Clear Light of Bliss – a commentary on meditations of Highest Yoga Tantra
 Great Treasury of Merit – a commentary on the puja Offering to the Spiritual Guide by the First Panchen Lama
 Mahamudra Tantra – meditation on the nature of mind according to Tantra
 Guide to Dakini Land – a commentary on the Highest Yoga Tantra practice of Vajrayogini
 Tantric Grounds and Paths – an explanation of the practice of the lower and upper classes of Tantra
 Essence of Vajrayana – a commentary on the Highest Yoga Tantra practice of Heruka

Religious practices
NKT-IKBU meditation practices include traditional Lamrim subjects such as "precious human life, death and rebirth, karma and samsara, taking refuge, the development of equanimity, kindness and compassion towards all beings, bodhicitta, understanding emptiness, and relying on a spiritual guide."

Chanted prayers follow "a traditional Tibetan format":

 going for refuge,
 generating bodhicitta and the ‘four immeasurables’ of boundless love, compassion, sympathetic joy and equanimity,
 imagining the Buddhas and bodhisattvas as physically present,
 a seven-limbed prayer of prostration, offerings, confession, rejoicing in virtue, asking holy beings to remain, requesting Dharma teachings and dedicating merit,
 offering the mandala (seeing the universe as a Pure Land of happiness),
 asking for and receiving blessings (becoming filled with ‘rays of light and nectar’ from the Buddha's heart),
 following specific meditation instructions, and
 dedicating the accumulated merit for the happiness of all beings.

While the Je Tsongkhapa and Dorje Shugden practices are recited daily, NKT-IKBU practitioners also regularly perform a number of other ritual practices, including Avalokiteshvara, Heruka, Vajrayogini, Tara, Manjushri, Amitayus and the Medicine Buddha. Bluck notes that "All these sādhanas have either been 'compiled from traditional sources' by Geshe Kelsang or translated under his supervision."

Religious observances
From its inception, NKT-IKBU Dharma centres followed a common calendar for religious observances, including some of the traditional Buddhist religious days. These include the following:

Monthly observances of Buddha Tara, Je Tsongkhapa, Eight Mahayana Precepts, and Dorje Shugden practices:
 Tara Day (8th of each month)
 Tsog Day (10th and 25th of each month)
 Precepts Day (15th of each month)
 Protector Day (29th of each month)

Annual holidays common to other Buddhist traditions: 
 Buddha's Enlightenment Day (15 April)
 Turning the Wheel of Dharma Day (4 June [49 days after Buddha's Enlightenment Day, and also Kelsang Gyatso's birthday])
 Buddha's Return from Heaven Day (22 September)
 Je Tsongkhapa Day (25 October)

Annual holidays unique to the NKT-IKBU:
 NKT Day (the first Saturday in April)
 International Temples Day (the first Saturday in November)

In 2004, the dates of lunar month observances were changed to the respective days in the common calendar.

NKT Day commemorates the founding of the NKT-IKBU, while International Temples Day is an opportunity to reflect on the importance of building Kadampa Buddhist Temples throughout the world.

International Buddhist festivals

Three annual Buddhist NKT Festivals are held each year: (1) The Spring Festival – held at Manjushri KMC in UK; (2) The Summer Festival – held at Manjushri KMC in UK; (3) The Fall Festival – held at various locations outside the UK. These are taught by the General Spiritual Director of the New Kadampa Tradition, currently Gen-la Kelsang Dekyong, and include teachings and empowerments from the Spiritual Director, reviews and meditations led by senior NKT Teachers, chanted meditations and offering ceremonies, and meditation retreats. They are attended by between 2000 and 6000 people from around the world.

Ordination

Within the NKT-IKBU community there are over 700 monks and nuns. Ordination ceremonies are usually held twice a year in the main NKT Temple at Manjushri Kadampa Meditation Center in Cumbria (UK), Ulverston. To ordain, one must ask Kelsang Gyatso's permission, and also the permission of his or her parents.

Buddha established both lay and ordained Pratimoksha vows, and established several levels of ordination vows. Traditionally, the different levels of ordination are distinguished by the specific number of vows taken, and by the ceremony in which they were received. In the NKT-IKBU, Kelsang Gyatso established a simplified tradition of ordination with ten vows that summarise the entire Vinaya, and a single ordination ceremony.

The 10 vows in New Kadampa Tradition ordination are identical for both nuns and monks:

 abandon killing
 abandon stealing
 abandon sexual activity
 abandon lying and cheating
 abandon taking intoxicants
 practice contentment
 reduce one's desire for worldly pleasures
 abandon engaging in meaningless activities
 maintain the commitments of refuge
 practise the three trainings of pure moral discipline, concentration, and wisdom

In The Ordination Handbook, Kelsang Gyatso described these vows as being easier to integrate into today's society, saying:

He also says:

The ordination tradition of the NKT-IKBU differs from that of other Buddhist groups in that it is based on the Mahayana Perfection of Wisdom Sutras instead of the Hinayana Vinaya Sutras. According to Kelsang Gyatso, "The Perfection of Wisdom Sutras are our Vinaya and Lamrim is its commentary." Robert Bluck observed that in the NKT-IKBU a Vinaya Sutras-based "full ordination is not available, and those who do ordain remain as novices, though again this is common in Tibet." Kelsang Gyatso explained that when a person is first ordained they receive a Rabjung (preliminary) ordination; when their renunciation improves and deepens, their ordination naturally transforms into a Getsul (sramanera) ordination; and when their renunciation becomes "a spontaneous wish to attain nirvana", their ordination naturally transforms into a Gelong (bhikkhu) ordination. For this reason, Kelsang Gyatso did not require a separate ritual ordination ceremony.

Monks and nuns in the NKT-IKBU abandon the physical signs of a lay person by shaving their head and wearing the maroon and yellow robes of an ordained person. They are given a new name which starts with "Kelsang", since it is traditional for ordinees to receive part of the ordaining master's name (up until his death, this was Kelsang Gyatso). They also engage in a Sojong ceremony twice a month to purify and restore their vows.

Monastics who break their ordination vows must leave their Centre for a year, with the exception of attending various bigger courses, Celebrations and Festivals. After that year, "with some conditions" they can return but cannot teach or participate in the Teacher Training Program.

Practitioners who wish to ordain approach their Buddhist teacher when they feel ready, and request formal permission once they have their teacher's consent. They may decide to live in one of the NKT-IKBU's many Buddhist centres, but this is not a requirement. They are, in general, not financially provided for by the NKT-IKBU. And, if they live in an NKT-IKBU Dharma centre, they still have to pay rent for their accommodation and pay for meals and the spiritual programs. To finance this, some have part-time or full-time work. According to Belither, "a few people are sponsored because of their NKT work but others are on 'extended working visits' or work locally, and some are legitimately on employment benefit." When working, they may "wear ordinary clothes if this is more convenient."

Teachers

Lineage of teachers

The NKT-IKBU traces its spiritual lineage through these main Buddhist figures:

 Buddha Shakyamuni
 Vajradhara
 Manjushri
 Atisha
 Je Tsongkhapa
 Pabongkhapa Déchen Nyingpo
 Kyabje Trijang Dorjechang
 Kelsang Gyatso

Kelsang Gyatso

After leaving Tibet in 1959, Kelsang Gyatso taught and engaged in retreat in India for 18 years. Trijang Rinpoche, the root Guru of Kelsang Gyatso, asked him to be the resident teacher at Manjushri Institute (now known as Manjushri Kadampa Meditation Centre) in England. Kelsang Gyatso taught the General Program at Manjushri from 1976 to 1987.

In 1987, Kelsang Gyatso entered a 3-year retreat at Tharpaland in Dumfries, Scotland. During his retreat, he wrote five books and established the foundations of the NKT-IKBU. Since that time, the NKT-IKBU has grown to comprise over 1,100 Centres and groups throughout 40 countries.

After completing his retreat in the spring of 1991, Kelsang Gyatso announced the creation of the NKT-IKBU, an event which was celebrated by his students in the NKT-IKBU magazine Full Moon as "a wonderful development in the history of the Buddhadharma."

In 1992, the NKT-IKBU was legally incorporated under English law, which constituted the formal foundation of the NKT-IKBU. The many Dharma Centres that were following Kelsang Gyatso's spiritual direction were gathered under the common auspices of the NKT-IKBU, with him as their General Spiritual Director (GSD). He remained GSD until August 2009 when he retired and was replaced by his successor, Gen-la Kelsang Khyenrab. Each of the individual Centers is legally and financially independent.

Successor to Kelsang Gyatso

From 1991 to 1995 Gelong Thubten Gyatso was designated as Kelsang Gyatso's future successor. He disrobed in 1995, and Kelsang Gyatso provisionally appointed 4 'Gen-las', i.e. Losang Kelsang, Kelsang Jangsem, Kelsang Dekyong and Samden Gyatso. After about a year, the former two resigned as Gen-las and were re-appointed as Resident Teachers. Samden Gyatso became the Deputy Spiritual Director and successor to Kelsang Gyatso while Kelsang Dekyong was appointed as the US National Spiritual Director. From this time onwards, the Deputy Spiritual Director also held the appointment of Resident Teacher at Manjushri Kadampa Meditation Centre.

In February 2007 Samden Gyatso resigned as Deputy Spiritual Director. Kelsang Khyenrab was appointed as Deputy Spiritual Director and became the General Spiritual Director when Kelsang Gyatso retired in Summer 2009.

In August 2001, Kelsang Gyato established a system of democratic succession for the General Spiritual Director of the NKT- IKBU. The Internal Rules state:

In 2008, Gen-la Khyenrab became Acting General Spiritual Director, under Kelsang Gyatso's supervision, and assumed the post of General Spiritual Director in August 2009 for a four-year term. Gen-la Dekyong, the National Spiritual Director of the United States of America, has in turn assumed the post of Deputy Spiritual Director, while retaining her post as US National Spiritual Director in accordance with the Internal Rules. Gen-la Khyenrab retired as the General Spiritual Director due to ill health in April 2010 and, in accordance with the Internal Rules, Gen-la Dekyong was appointed as General Spiritual Director.  Her position as Deputy Spiritual Director was taken by Gen-la Kunsang.

Other teachers

Alongside Kelsang Gyatso, who as founder and former spiritual director was the main teacher of the NKT-IKBU and his successors, all teachings (i.e. the three study programs) are held by Western students; lay persons and ordained alike. Qualification as an NKT-IKBU Dharma teacher is generally achieved by attending the NKT-IKBU's own Teacher Training Program, which Kelsang Gyatso regarded as "a western equivalent to the traditional Tibetan Geshe degree."

Cozort has noted that "Several of the most prominent Tibetan teachers have long recognized themselves the need to train Westerners as Dharma teachers." Kelsang Gyatso explained the importance of Western Dharma teachers to the flourishing of Dharma in the world, saying that one fully qualified teacher is worth a thousand enlightened students. He expounded on the qualifications of NKT-IKBU teachers in 1990:

Regarding the qualifications of NKT-IKBU teachers, Kay observed that "Whilst personal experience of the teachings is considered important, the dominant view within the NKT is that the main qualification of a teacher is their purity of faith and discipleship."

According to Robert Bluck, "Most teachers are appointed to centres by Kelsang Gyatso before they have completed the Teaching Training Programme and continue studying by correspondence, with an intensive study programme at Manjushri each summer." Daniel Cozort explained that this is "rather like graduate students who teach undergraduate courses while pursuing their own Ph.D.'s."

Kelsang Gyatso said that monks, nuns, lay men and lay women can all become Spiritual Guides if they have the necessary experience, qualities and training. All NKT-IKBU teachers, lay and ordained, study on the same study and retreat programmes. The Internal Rules specify the criteria for completing the programme:

In addition to the TTP commitment, all Resident Teachers have to attend International Teacher Training Program each year, taught in repeated rotation according to a sixteen-year study scheme.

Ordained and lay Resident Teachers who have taught successfully for four years are given the titles 'Gen' and 'Kadam', respectively.

Former Senior Teachers

Kelsang Samden
Kelsang Samden was appointed by Kelsang Gyatso as the General Spiritual Director of the New Kadampa Tradition in 2005. In 2008 he was disrobed and effectively excommunicated by Kelsang Gyatso following a sexual scandal.

Kelsang Khyenrab

Kelsang Khyenrab who studied and practised Buddhism since 1980 under the guidance of Kelsang Gyatso, was formerly General Spiritual Director of the New Kadampa Tradition (NKT). In 2008, Khyenrab became Acting Spiritual Director, under Kelsang Gyatso's supervision, and assumed the post of Spiritual Director in August 2009 for a four-year term. As Spiritual Director,  Khyenrab was the Resident Teacher at Manjushri Temple and Kadampa Meditation Centre, the Mother Center of New Kadampa Buddhism. He Khyenrab resigned in 2010, for health reasons, and was replaced by Kelsang Dekyong.

Thubten Gyatso

From 1991 to 1995 Gelong Thubten Gyatso (a.k.a. Gen Thubten or Neil Elliot) was appointed as a 'Gen-la' and Resident Teacher of Madhyamaka Centre (Pocklington, York) and as Kelsang Gyatso's future successor. He was described by the NKT as "the first qualified English Tantric meditation master in Britain" and was known as the 'heart-disciple' of Geshe Kelsang who wrote a prayer for his long life which was recited regularly at NKT centres. According to Madeleine Bunting "Gen Thubten [..] is described by former members as having been the 'power behind the throne'." Bunting states further that "Former members understand that Gen Thubten was disrobed because of a breach of his monastic vows. He was deeply revered by the 3,000 NKT members for his knowledge of Buddhism and his charismatic teaching."

Organisation and development

Internal Rules

The legal document A Moral Discipline Guide: The Internal Rules of The New Kadampa Tradition – International Kadampa Buddhist Union explains that the NKT-IKBU

The New Kadampa Truth website explains: "Its Internal Rules – containing numerous checks and balances on the behavior, election and dismissal of the administrators, teachers, and spiritual directors – also guard against any extreme behavior and are legally binding." An NBO member describes them:

Growth
The NKT-IKBU currently lists more than 200 centres and around 900 branch classes/study groups in 40 countries, with an estimated 8,000 members. The centres are independent charitable corporations, and the groups are branches off an established centre which meet weekly in places such as churches and community centres.

In comparison, Waterhouse says the NKT-IKBU "is very good at marketing its product", with Centers and branches producing leaflets that advertise local NKT-IKBU groups in their respective towns, a level of publicity that according to Jones is comparatively more "forceful and extroverted" with regard to other Buddhist groups, and has helped the NKT-IKBU to achieve "a phenomenal increase in membership and centres." Another attraction is the high level of activity at an NKT-IKBU Dharma centre, where it is often possible to be taking part at the centre every day of the week, in contrast to other groups "which meet on a weekly basis but provide little other support or activity."

Bluck attributes NKT-IKBU's rapid growth to "a wish to share the Dharma rather than ‘conversion and empire-building’." Kay says that the NKT-IKBU is sensitive to criticism on the subject of expansion and cites Kelsang Gyatso's response to any criticisms about its outreach efforts, stating that "every organization 'tries to attract more people with appropriate publicity.'"

New Dharma centres are expected to be self-supporting, as neither Kelsang Gyatso nor the NKT-IKBU owns the centres.

Kadampa Meditation Centers

A Kadampa Meditation Centre (KMC) is a Kadampa Dharma Center that serves the local, national, and international communities. A KMC is generally more centrally organised than regular Kadampa Buddhist Centers. Besides having a program of courses for the local community, KMCs host major gatherings such as Dharma Celebrations, National Festivals, and International Festivals. They are also home to the International Kadampa Temples. KMCs are non-profit organisations and all their annual profits are donated to the International Temples Project. There are currently 18 KMCs around the world, with several in the US.

Temples for World Peace, World Peace Cafés, and Hotel Kadampas

The NKT-IKBU has established a Kadampa Buddhist Temple in the United Kingdom, as well as in Canada, the United States, and Spain; recently opened a Temple in Brazil, with plans to build one in Germany too. The NKT-IKBU states in its publicity that:

"World Peace Cafés" have opened at some NKT Centers, starting in Ulverston, UK and now in other countries including the United States.

In 2005 the NKT-IKBU opened their first "World Peace Hotel", called "Hotel Kadampa": a no-smoking, alcohol-free hotel in Southern Spain. (A second Hotel Kadampa opened in Montecatini in Tuscany, Italy, but has since closed). The hotel "functions as a normal hotel but with the benefit of a shrine room and meditation teaching. The absence of alcohol and loud entertainment attracts those who appreciated a quiet and peaceful atmosphere."

International Retreat Centers

International Retreat Centers (IRCs) are centres that offer facilities for those wishing to do both long-term and short-term meditation retreats. Tharpaland International Retreat Centre was founded by Kelsang Gyatso in 1985, when he began a three-year retreat there, and has since hosted thousands of people. Kailash International Retreat Center was founded in Switzerland in 2007.

New Kadampa Tradition and Gelugpa Tradition
According to the NKT-IKBU, it is Tibetan in its antecedents and follows the teachings of the historic, "Old" Kadampa and the "New Kadam" Tradition of Je Tsongkhapa, the latter of which became the Gelug school of Tibetan Buddhism.

Critics on the other hand characterise the NKT-IKBU as "a breakaway movement and argue that the New Kadampa Tradition, as it is known today, is not part of the ancient Kadampa Tradition but a split from the [contemporary] Gelug school."

The founder of the Gelug school, Je Tsongkhapa, and his disciples were popularly known as the "new school of Kadam." Je Tsongkhapa himself referred to his monastic order as "the New Kadam" (Tib. Kadam Sarpa). The term Gelug came into use only after his death. Je Tsongkhapa's apparent eclecticism was actually "an attempt to determine which teachings and practices should be considered normative." In creating a new synthesis of Buddhist doctrine, ethics and practice, Je Tsongkhapa endeavoured "to rid Tibetan [Buddhism] of its pre-Buddhist shamanic elements," and the NKT-IKBU sees itself as continuing to keep Tsongkhapa's unique form of Buddhism free of non-Buddhist teachings and practices. In this regard, Kelsang Gyatso explains:

In short, Waterhouse says that "the early Gelugpa legacy is one which the NKT wishes to emulate" and that the name of the organisation itself makes a statement about its "perceived roots within the 'pure' transmission of [Atisha's] Indian Buddhism into Tibet." According to Lopez, "For Kelsang Gyatso to call his group the New Kadampa Tradition, therefore, is ideologically charged, implying as it does that he and his followers represent the tradition of the founder, Tsong kha pa, more authentically than the Geluk establishment and the Dalai Lama himself." Kay comments:

Kelsang Gyatso used the terms New Kadampa and Gelugpa synonymously, in accordance with his lineage gurus as well as the current Dalai Lama, who explained: "So we call the teachings of both Atisha and Je Tsongkhapa the Kadampa tradition, and then slowly this becomes the New Kadampa and then finally it is known as the Gelugpa." Kelsang Gyatso refers to NKT-IKBU practitioners as Gelugpas, defining Gelug as:

When asked about the relationship between the NKT-IKBU and the Gelug tradition, Kelsang Gyatso again self-identified as a Gelugpa:

The closing prayers of all NKT-IKBU spiritual practices include two dedication prayers for the flourishing of the 'Virtuous Tradition' (i.e., the Gelugpas), these being "recited every day after teachings and pujas at all Gelugpa monasteries and Dharma Centres."

Of the words, "New Kadampa Tradition", James Belither (NKT Secretary for 20 years) states that the "word 'New' is used not to imply that it is newly created, but that it is a fresh presentation of Buddhadharma in a form and manner that is appropriate to the needs and conditions of the modern world."

Kadampa Buddhism and Tibetan Buddhism

According to Waterhouse, Kelsang Gyatso "has broken away from the school's representatives in India and Tibet." Cozort confirms that the NKT-IKBU "is not subordinate to Tibetan authorities other than Geshe Gyatso himself." James Belither explained that the NKT-IKBU "does not accept the Dalai Lama's authority 'simply because there is no political or ecclesiastical reason for doing so.'"

Instead of presenting itself as a Tibetan tradition, James Belither has said that the NKT-IKBU is "a Mahayana Buddhist tradition with historical connections with Tibet", saying it wishes "to present Dharma in a way appropriate to their own culture and society without the need to adopt Tibetan culture and customs." Bluck sees an "apparent contradiction between claiming a pure Tibetan lineage and complete separation from contemporary Tibetan religion, culture and politics." The NKT-IKBU disagrees that there is a contradiction, saying "It is possible to be a follower of Je Tsongkhapa's lineage but not a Tibetan Buddhist, just as a child of Russian immigrants to America may consider themselves American but not Russian."

Despite the NKT-IKBU's separation from contemporary Tibetan Buddhism, the commitments undertaken by its members also include maintaining "a deep respect" for all Dharma teachings and other Buddhist traditions. When asked about sectarianism between the Gelugpas and other schools of Tibetan Buddhism, Kelsang Gyatso replied:

Relationship with the current Dalai Lama 
The NKT has become almost synonymous for scholars and practitioners of Tibetan Buddhism with the “anti-Dalai Lama” group for its involvement in a divisive Tibetan diasporic conflict, a debate between propitiators of Dorje Shugden, a Geluk
protector deity dating to the 15th century, and the Dalai Lama, who banned Shugden practice in all Central Tibetan
Administration institutions and monasteries in 1996.} TMartin Mills states:

Robert Thurman states the International Shugden Community is a front group of the New Kadampa Tradition, something they deny.

The NKT-IKBU is one of the largest Buddhist movements in the UK, which describes itself as "a new organization making an ancient tradition accessible to all", by combining Tibetan tradition with western adaptation. Oxford professor Peter Clarke sees a paradox here, and has characterised the NKT-IKBU as a "controversial Tibetan Buddhist New Religious Movement," not because of any moral failings but because of the NKT-IKBU's separation from contemporary Tibetan Buddhism. Madeleine Bunting writes:

New Kadampa Survivors 
There is a group of former members who speak out against the New Kadampa Tradition and their demonstrations against the Dalai Lama's ban on Dorje Shugden practice. The Cult Information Centre stated in 1999, "We have certainly had complaints about NKT activities, and we are concerned about them" but as of the present day they have no mention of these concerns or the NKT on their site.

Academic Articles 
 The New Kadampa Tradition and the Continuity of Tibetan Buddhism in Transition – David N. Kay, Journal of Contemporary Religion, Vol. 12, No. 3, 1997; pp. 277–293.
 Tibetan and Zen Buddhism in Britain: Transplantation, Development and Adaptation - The New Kadampa Tradition (NKT), and the Order of Buddhist Contemplatives (OBC) – David N. Kay, London and New York, 2005,

See also
Heruka Kadampa Meditation Centre

References

Sources
 

 
 
 
 
 
 
 
 

 
1991 establishments in England
Buddhist charities
Buddhist new religious movements
Buddhist organisations based in the United Kingdom
Dorje Shugden controversy
History of Tibetan Buddhism
New religious movements
Religious organizations established in 1991